Osseus Labyrint is an experimental arts entity which has been working in multiple disciplines and forms of media since 1989.

The group describes its work as "a manifestation of accumulated data from billions of years of evolving and recombining of matter and energy." Founded and directed by Hannah Sim and Mark Steger, Osseus Labyrint has inhabited extreme, remote, conventional, and self-made environments. The group's work has been presented live and broadcast throughout the US, Canada, Mexico, England, Scotland, Switzerland, Germany, Austria, Hungary, the Czech Republic, Slovakia, Slovenia, Taiwan, Hong Kong, Australia, New Zealand and over the World Wide Web.

The pair has found much fame through their work with the band Tool; they have appeared in Tool's music video "Schism" and live on stage at many of Tool's concerts. Osseus Labyrint has also appeared as a pair in the film Men in Black II doing the same "interpretative dance" seen in the "Schism" music video. Sim died on November 10, 2020.

References

External links
official site

International artist groups and collectives